Fleet Command is responsible for the command, operations, readiness, training and force generation of all ships, submarines, aircraft squadrons, diving teams, and shore establishments of the Royal Australian Navy.

The position of Commander Australian Fleet was established in 2007. The previous positions since 1913 were:
 Rear Admiral Commanding HM Australian Fleet (1913–1926),
 Rear Admiral Commanding HM Australian Squadron (1926–1949),
 Flag Officer Commanding HM Australian Fleet (1949–1988, regularly abbreviated as FOCAF), and
 Maritime Commander Australia (1988–2007 – MCAUST).

History
Prior to 1913, all naval activities and forces in Australian waters were controlled by the British Royal Navy. In 1859, Australia Station was established as a separate command of the Royal Navy, responsible for all the waters around the Australian continent, in addition to the British and Australian colonial possessions in the South Pacific. It was at this stage that the forerunner of Commander Australian Fleet, Officer Commanding Imperial Squadron Australian Station, was created. Between the Federation of Australia and formation of the Commonwealth Naval Forces in 1901 to the year of 1913, the Royal Navy began a process of transferring all command responsibility in Australian waters over to the Australian Government, as well as replacing equipment and personnel with Australian variants. The Commonwealth Naval Forces were renamed to Royal Australian Navy in 1911. With the transfer complete in 1913, the position of Rear Admiral Commanding HM Australian Fleet was formed, with control over all naval combat operations and forces; the post was renamed Rear Admiral Commanding HM Australian Squadron in 1926. Despite this position being a command of the RAN, the majority of occupants were Royal Navy officers attached to, or on loan to, the RAN.

In 1949, Rear Admiral Commanding HM Australian Squadron was redesignated Flag Officer Commanding HM Australian Fleet. This was followed by a renaming to Maritime Commander Australia in 1988, and more recently to Commander Australian Fleet in 2007. Throughout its existence, the command has administered Australian naval forces as they have been deployed for duty in the First World War, Second World War, Malayan Emergency, Korean War, Indonesian Confrontation, Vietnam War, Operation Navy Help Darwin (1974–75), the Gulf War, War in Afghanistan and Iraq War, in addition to peacekeeping operations. The rank associated with this position today is rear admiral, however some of the earlier appointees held a different rank.

During the East Timor operations of 1999–2000, the then Maritime Commander Australia held the Task force designator Commander Task Force 627.

Command and staff
The Fleet Command is led by the Commander Australian Fleet who has overall command of the Fleet and supported by the Director-General Maritime Operations and the Commodore Warfare who have delegated responsibilities for operational command and maritime warfare alongside the Chief of Joint Operations. The principal role of the Fleet Command is to "plan, prepare for, and conduct maritime operations for the protection and promotion of Australia's security and interests". With this directive, the operations carried out or planned by the Commander Australian Fleet or the delegated command staff fall into three distinct categories: defence of sovereign territory, protection of overseas trade and offshore resources, and contingencies.

Commander Australian Fleet
The Fleet Commander is the chief maritime and amphibious operations advisor to the Chief of Navy. The Chief of Navy delegates full command of ships, submarines, aircraft squadrons, diving teams and shore establishments of the Royal Australian Navy to the Fleet Commander. The Fleet Commander is also responsible for overseeing the training, readiness, maintenance, capabilities management and force generation of the Fleet.

The Fleet Commander delegates the management of naval bases and operational command of Fleet units to force commanders. The Fleet Commander delegates operational control of fleet units to the Director General Maritime Operations and tactical command to the Director General Maritime Operations, the Commodore Warfare, tactical warfare commander, or a task group commander. Unless the Chief of the Defence Force directs the Chief of Navy to assign specific forces to the Joint Operations Command for joint or multinational operations, the Fleet Commander retains control of fleet forces.

Director-General Maritime Operations
The Director-General Maritime Operations (DGMAROPS) is the deputy to the Fleet Commander located within the Headquarters Joint Operations Command. The Director-General Maritime Operations is responsible for providing advice on the preparedness and readiness of the Fleet Command and for the operational control and tactical command of delegated fleet force elements and all Royal Australian Navy units at sea and on "routine activities". The Director-General Maritime Operations is also the Navy Submarine Operating Authority and in charge of the Navy Activity Schedule.

The Director-General Maritime Operations also oversees the Maritime Operations Centre within the Headquarters Joint Operations Command. The Maritime Operations Centre is responsible for the coordination of all maritime operations of units of the Fleet Command outside of Joint Task Forces.

Commodore Flotillas
The Fleet Commander's seagoing subordinate is Commodore Flotillas (COMFLOT), a position established by that name, and previously known as Commodore Warfare (between 2011 and 2018). In 2018, the name was reverted to COMFLOT under the direction of Commander Australian Fleet. The Commodore Flotillas oversees the Australian Fleet Battle Staff and the Australian Maritime Warfare Centre and is responsible for maritime warfare capability management and force generation.

Australian Fleet Battle Staff
The Australian Fleet Battle Staff is the naval staff of the Royal Australian Navy responsible for the command of multinational maritime warfare task groups and the tactical maritime expertise advice to the Australian Defence Force. The Staff also provides sea control operational planning with input from Fleet Forces. Members of the Australian Fleet Battle Staff serve afloat or ashore during maritime operations.

Australian Maritime Warfare Centre
The Australian Maritime Warfare Centre develops maritime warfare policy and formulates joint doctrine and tactics for the Royal Australian Navy. The centre also provides operational analysis to the Defence Science and Technology Group and other analytical capabilities for the Commodore Warfare.

Fleet Forces
The operational command of the Force Element Groups of the Fleet Command are delegated from the Fleet Commander to the respective force commanders. The force commanders are responsible for the policy development, administrative management, operational capability, and force generation of all units and personnel of their respective fleet force. The Director-General Maritime Operations will have operational control of the fleet forces when required for deployed operations.

Surface Force
The Commander Surface Force oversees the capability management of the destroyers, frigates, and support vessels of the Royal Australian Navy.

Submarine Force
The Commander Submarine Force is charged with the responsibility of the operations of the Royal Australian Navy Submarine Service alongside the Navy Strategic Command's Director-General Submarine Capability.

Fleet Air Arm
The Commander Fleet Air Arm is in charge of the operational management and airworthiness capabilities of Royal Australian Navy aviation.

Mine Warfare, Hydrographic and Patrol Forces
The Commander Mine Warfare, Clearance Diving, Hydrographic, Meteorological and Patrol Forces is responsible for the operational capability and logistical management of the mine warfare forces, patrol forces, Clearance Diving Branch, the Australian Hydrographic Service of the Royal Australian Navy.

Shore Force
The Commander Shore Force is responsible for the shore capabilities and naval facilities including the maintenance and upkeep of the infrastructure, properties and ports of the Royal Australian Navy in accordance with seaworthiness requirements. The Shore Force also provides naval policy input to the Defence Estate and Infrastructure Group on matters of preparedness and garrison support.

Information Warfare Force
The Commander Information Warfare Force is in charge of the information warfare, signals intelligence and imagery intelligence capabilities of the Royal Australian Navy. The Information Warfare Force was established in 2015 through the amalgamation of five Navy Imagery Units, the Navy Tactical Data Link Organisation, the Maritime Data Correlation Centre, the Maritime Intelligence Support Centre, the Directorate of Maritime Command, Control, Communications and Computers and Electronic Warfare, and the Fleet Information and Communications Technology Support Teams.

List of Commanders Australian Fleet
The following list chronologically records those who have held the post of Commander Australian Fleet or its preceding positions. However, the position of Officers Commanding Imperial Squadron Australian Station (1859–1913) is not included in this list as it was administered as a command of the Royal Navy, and existed before the formation of the Royal Australian Navy. The official title of the commander at that period of time is listed immediately before the officers who held that role. The rank and honours are as at the completion of the commander's term.

Footnotes
 "HM" (His/Her Majesty's) is not always included when referring to these titles.

References

 
Leadership of the Australian Defence Force
Royal Australian Navy